Olen pahoillani – valitut teokset 1994–2000 (2001) is a compilation album by the Finnish rock group Absoluuttinen Nollapiste.

Track listing
 "Hyviä muistoja, huomenna suihkuun" (Tommi Liimatta, Aki Läkkölä) - 3:59
 "Ja jos" (Liimatta) - 3:54
 "Jälkivaatimus" (Liimatta, Aake Otsala) - 3:53
 "Ajoratamaalaus" (Liimatta) - 3:35
 "Silti" (Liimatta, S. Lyhty) - 3:02
 "Kupit on kuin olisi häät" (Liimatta, Otsala, Lääkkölä) - 2:58
 "Käyneet hedelmät" (Liimatta, Läkkölä) - 4:58
 "Olen pahoillani" (Lääkkölä) - 3:53
 "Kotiinpaluu, jotenkin" (Otsala, Liimatta, Lääkkölä) - 3:01
 "Saatteeksi" (Liimatta) - 2:29
 "Matkustajakoti Lintukoto" (Liimatta) - 3:17
 "Esinekeräilyn hitaus" (Liimatta) - 2:34
 "Portaat" (Otsala) - 3:24
 "Raami" (Liimatta) - 2:43
 "Soita kotiin, Elvis" (Liimatta) - 3:32
 "Savu meihin" (Liimatta, Läkkölä) - 3:45
 "Neljä ruukkua neliössä" (Liimatta, Lääkkölä) - 3:47
 "Rarmos Ybrehtar" (Liimatta) - 2:35
 "Eläimen varmuus" (Liimatta) - 3:04
 "Koira haistaa pelon (koira haisee puulle)" (Liimatta) - 6:13

External links
  Album entry at band's official website

Absoluuttinen Nollapiste albums
2001 compilation albums